

The Women's combined road race / time trial cycling event for blind & visually impaired competitors at the 2004 Summer Paralympics was held at Vouliagmeni. It consisted of a road race held on 25 September and a time trial two days later.

Rankings were determined by adding the finishing positions in the two races, if this produced ties the aggregate times were used as tie-breakers. The event was won by Karissa Whitsell and her sighted pilot Katie Compton, representing .

Final ranking

References

M
2004 in women's road cycling
Vouliagmeni Olympic Centre events